Mormyshi is a rural locality (a selo) and the administrative center of Mormyshansky Selsoviet, Romanovsky District, Altai Krai, Russia. The population was 149 as of 2013. There is 1 street.

Geography 
Mormyshi is located on the Gorkoye Lake, 29 km south of Romanovo (the district's administrative centre) by road. Buranovka is the nearest rural locality.

References 

Rural localities in Romanovsky District, Altai Krai